Egon Beiler was born March 27, 1953 in Linz, Austria. He was a past member of three Olympic wrestling teams and has numerous National titles to his name.

A graduate of the University of Western Ontario Dr. Beiler has been practicing dentistry in the Kitchener-Waterloo area since 1981. He continues to play squash and curling. He has a cottage in the Beaver Valley area. Married to wife Carol Beiler, and together they have 5 children.

References

External links
 Link to Dr. Egon Beiler's Clinic:  www.kwdentistry.ca
 Sports competitions: 

Living people
1953 births
Sportspeople from Linz
Austrian emigrants to Canada
Olympic wrestlers of Canada
Wrestlers at the 1972 Summer Olympics
Wrestlers at the 1976 Summer Olympics
Canadian male sport wrestlers
Wrestlers at the 1974 British Commonwealth Games
Wrestlers at the 1978 Commonwealth Games
Commonwealth Games gold medallists for Canada
Pan American Games gold medalists for Canada
Pan American Games bronze medalists for Canada
University of Western Ontario alumni
Commonwealth Games medallists in wrestling
Pan American Games medalists in wrestling
Wrestlers at the 1975 Pan American Games
Wrestlers at the 1979 Pan American Games
Medalists at the 1975 Pan American Games
Medalists at the 1979 Pan American Games
Medallists at the 1974 British Commonwealth Games
Medallists at the 1978 Commonwealth Games